Križ ("Cross" in several Slavic languages) may refer to:

Croatia
 Križ, Zagreb County, a village and municipality in Zagreb County, Croatia
 Križ Brdovečki, a village near Marija Gorica, Croatia
 Križ Hrastovački, a village near Petrinja, Croatia
 Križ Kamenica, a village near Brinje, Croatia
 Križ Koranski, a village near Barilović, Croatia

Slovenia
 Križ, Komenda, a village in Slovenia
 Križ, Sevnica, a village in Slovenia
 Križ, Sežana, a village in Slovenia
 Križ, Trebnje, a village in Slovenia

See also

 Cross (disambiguation)
 Kriz (disambiguation)